Papi District is a district (bakhsh) in Khorramabad County, Lorestan Province, Iran. At the 2006 census, its population was 16,898, in 3,374 families.  The district has one city, Sepiddasht.   The district contains five Rural Districts: Chamsangar Rural District, Gerit Rural District, Keshvar Rural District, Sepiddasht Rural District, and Tang-e Haft Rural District.

References 

Districts of Lorestan Province
Khorramabad County